Gerard Charles Windsor (born 29 December 1944) is an Australian author and literary critic. He was dux of St Ignatius' College, Riverview in both 1961 and 1962, and a student of Melvyn Morrow. Windsor trained as a Jesuit from ages 18 to 24 before realizing it was not his vocation.

Biography
He studied Arts at the Australian National University and Sydney University, before briefly studying medicine. He is a writer, having published ten books, including fiction, compilations of essays, and memoirs. Awarded the 2005 Pascall Prize for Critical Writing, he noted that "The primary responsibility of the review is to entertain the reader...The primary responsibility is not to the book or the movie or the play or whatever, which is not to be utterly amoral about it. But nevertheless, it should be a work whole in itself, and give pleasure." Windsor's novel, I Have Kissed Your Lips, was shortlisted for The Age Book of the Year award and longlisted for the 2005 Miles Franklin Award.

Bibliography

Books
Family Lore (1990) (memoir)
The Harlots Enter First (1982) (stories)
Memories of the Assassination Attempt and Other Stories (1985)
Heaven Where The Bachelors Sit  (1996) (memoir)
That Fierce Virgin (1988) (novella)
I'll Just Tell You This (1999) (memoir)
I Asked Cathleen To Dance (1999) (memoir)
The Mansions of Bedlam: Stories and Essays (2000)
I Have Kissed Your Lips (2004) (novel)
Ned Kelly and the Odd Rellie (2007) (clerihews)
 
The Tempest-Tossed Church: Being a Catholic Today (2017)

Critical studies and reviews of Windsor's work
All day long the noise of battle

References

Links
 Profile of Gerard Windsor,  brisbanewritersfestival.com.au (2003)
Culture and the Arts: Australia in Brief from the Department of Foreign Affairs and Trade

1944 births
Living people
21st-century Australian novelists
Australian essayists
Male essayists
Australian literary critics
Australian male novelists
Australian memoirists
Australian male short story writers
People educated at Saint Ignatius' College, Riverview
Place of birth missing (living people)
Australian Roman Catholics
Australian Jesuits
Former Jesuits
21st-century Australian short story writers
21st-century essayists
21st-century Australian male writers
21st-century memoirists